The Rights of Man is the third album by Irish folk and rebel band The Wolfe Tones. The album features songs of various themes including Irish republicanism and emigration.

Track list
 The Rights Of Man	
 Raynard The Fox	
 Long Black Veil	
 Up The Border	
 I'm A Rover	
 Ode To Biddy McGee	
Wrap The Green Flag Round Me
 Enniskillen Fusiliers	
 Treat Me Daughter Kindly	
 Four Strong Winds	
 Banks Of The Sweet Smirla Side	
 Lagan Love

References

External links
 Entry at discogs.com

The Wolfe Tones albums
1968 albums